Oh Gott, Herr Pfarrer is a German television series.

See also
List of German television series

External links
 

1988 German television series debuts
1989 German television series endings
German-language television shows
Das Erste original programming